Charles Richard Francis Maunder (1937 – 2018) was a British mathematician and musicologist.

Early life
Maunder was educated at the Royal Grammar School, High Wycombe, and Jesus College, Cambridge, before going on to complete a PhD at Christ’s College, Cambridge, in 1962. After teaching at Southampton University he became a fellow of Christ’s in 1964.

Mathematics
Maunder's field of work was algebraic topology. He used Postnikov systems to give an alternative construction of the Atiyah–Hirzebruch spectral sequence. With this construction, the differentials can be better described. The family of higher cohomology operations on mod-2 cohomology that he constructed has been discussed by several authors. In 1981 he gave a short proof of the Kan-Thurston theorem, according to which for every path-connected topological space X there is a discrete group π such that there is a homology isomorphism of the Eilenberg–MacLane space K(π,1) after X. His textbook Algebraic Topology (1970) continues to circulate in the 1996 Dover edition.

Musicology
Maunder created a new version of Mozart's Requiem. Following on from other musicologists such as Ernst Hess, Franz Beyer and Robert D. Levin, he presented a fundamental revision of Mozart's last work, in which, like his predecessors, he wanted to remove Süssmayr's additions as far as possible and replace them with Mozart's own ideas. This new version was recorded by Christopher Hogwood with the Academy of Ancient Music in 1983 and the score was published in 1988.

In doing so, Maunder rejected Süssmayr's Sanctus and Benedictus completely and removed them from the work; he considered only the Agnus Dei to be authentic because of its comparisons with other church music works by Mozart. Maunder also composed an Amen fugue for the conclusion of the Lacrimosa, for which he took Mozart's sketch sheet and a fugue for organ roll by Mozart as a starting point. He also fundamentally revised Süssmayr's instrumentation throughout the Requiem. 

Maunder's edition of Mozart's C minor Mass was published in 1990 and was first recorded by Hogwood in the same year.

Works

Mathematics
 
 
  Reissued in 1980 (Cambridge University Press, ISBN 0-521-29840-7) and 1996 (Dover Publications, Mineola, New York, ISBN 0-486-69131-4)

Musicology
 (as editor) 
 
 (as editor)

References

1937 births
2018 deaths
People educated at the Royal Grammar School, High Wycombe
Alumni of Jesus College, Cambridge
Alumni of Christ's College, Cambridge
British mathematicians
British musicologists
Mozart scholars